Gene Vincent Kennedy (October 28, 1927 – March 7, 2021) was an American politician in the state of Iowa.

Kennedy was born in LeMars, Iowa. He attended Loras College and was a businessman, advertiser, and insurance man. He served in the Iowa State Senate from 1971 to 1975, and House of Representatives from 1969 to 1971 as a Democrat.

References

1927 births
2021 deaths
People from Le Mars, Iowa
Loras College alumni
Businesspeople from Iowa
Democratic Party Iowa state senators
Democratic Party members of the Iowa House of Representatives